Dr Abhay R. Vasavada started Raghudeep Eye Clinic (REH) – as a cataract speciality center in 1984 Ahmedabad, India. He is the first Indian and the second Asian to be awarded the Binkhorst Medal Lecture by the American Society of Cataract & Refractive Surgeons (ASCRS) in 2011.

Dr. Abhay Vasavada completed his master's degree in ophthalmology (M.S.) from the Maharaja Sayajirao University of Baroda in 1975. He was awarded the degree of a Fellow of the Royal College of Surgeons of England  (F.R.C.S.) in 1980. He also completed higher surgical training. He went on to specialize in cataract surgery and intra-ocular lens implantation.

Awards
1) Recipient of best researcher award and Dr. B. C. Roy Award  by Honourable President Dr. K.R. Narayanan in 1997.

2) In 2002 he was the recipient of 1st Asia Pacific Association of Cataract & Refractive Surgeons (APACRS) Award for Best Educator in Asia Pacific Region.

3) He has been a recipient of American Academy of Ophthalmology's Achievement Award, 2005.

4) He has also been awarded the Arthur Lim Oration by the Asia-Pacific Association of Cataract and Refractive Surgeons (APACRS) for the year 2010.

References

External links
 Raghudeep Eye Hospital Website 
 Eye World
 apaophth.org
ophthalmology times modern medicine

Indian ophthalmologists
Year of birth missing (living people)
Living people
Place of birth missing (living people)